ICOM may refer to:

 International Council of Museums
 Icom Incorporated, radio equipment manufacturer 
 Industrial Common Ownership Movement (ICOM), a co-operative federation that now forms part of Co-operatives UK
 Inputs, Controls, Outputs, and Mechanisms (ICOM), the conceptual parts of the IDEF0 function modeling methodology
 ICOM Simulations, software company
 ICOM Tele A/S, a Danish telecommunications operator
 Idaho College of Osteopathic Medicine, a medical school in the United States